Campbell Brown may refer to:

 Campbell Brown (footballer) (born 1983), Australian rules footballer
 Campbell Brown (golfer) (1876–1951), American golfer
 Campbell Brown (journalist) (born 1968), American journalist